This article is about music-related events in 1851.

Events
February – Operatic tenor Sims Reeves returns to perform in Dublin with his new wife, soprano Charlotte Emma Lucombe.
February 6 – Schumann's Symphony No. 3 receives its première in Düsseldorf, the composer conducting.
March 11 – Giuseppe Verdi's opera Rigoletto is first performed at La Fenice in Venice.
April 5 – Jenny Lind visits the Mammoth Cave in Kentucky, USA.
July 23 – Richard Wagner writes down the leitmotif for the "Ride of the Valkyries".
Operatic baritone Hans von Milde marries soprano Rosa Agthe.
Eight-year-old Adelina Patti sings in public for the first time.

Published popular music
 "Cora, the Indian Maiden's Song" – w. Shirley Brooks m. Alexander Lee
 "Old Folks at Home" (Way Down Upon the Swanee River) by Stephen Foster
 "Ring, Ring, de Banjo" by Stephen Foster
 "I Would Not Die in Summer Time" by Stephen Foster
 "Laura Lee" by Stephen Foster

Classical music
Woldemar Bargiel 
Piano Trio No. 1 in F major, Op. 6
String Quartet No.3, Op.15b
Johannes Brahms 
Scherzo in E-flat minor for solo piano, Op. 4
Heimkehr (Homecoming) for voice and piano, Op. 7 No. 6
Stephen Heller – Pensées fugitives, Op.30
Franz Liszt 
Transcendental Études for Piano, S 139
Grandes études de Paganini
Johann Kaspar Mertz – Fantaisie über 'Don Juan', Op.28
Jacques Offenbach – Concerto Rondo for cello and orchestra.
George Onslow – Wind Quintet Op. 81
Anton Rubinstein – Symphony No. 2 (Ocean) (first version)
Robert Schumann
Symphony No. 4 from 1841, revised
Violin Sonata No. 1
Violin Sonata No. 2
Der Rose Pilgerfahrt, oratorio
Mädchenlieder, Op. 103
7 Lieder, Op. 104
6 Gesänge, Op. 107
Piano Trio No. 3, Op. 110
3 Gedichte, Op. 119
Julius Cäsar Ouverture, Op. 128
3 Fantasiestücke, for piano
Märchenbilder, for piano and viola
Adrien-François Servais 
Souvenir de la Suisse, Op.10
6 Caprices for Cello, Op.11
Hugo Staehle – 6 Lieder, Op.2

Opera
Félicien-César David – La Perle du Bresil
Charles Gounod – Sapho
Albert Lortzing – Die Oprnprobe
Joachim Raff – König Alfred
Giuseppe Verdi – Rigoletto

Births
January 25 – Jan Blockx, pianist, composer and music teacher (d. 1912)
January 27 – Gaspar Villate, composer (d. 1891)
February 12 – Anna Yesipova, pianist (d. 1914)
March 27
Ruperto Chapí, composer (d. 1909)
Vincent d'Indy, composer (d. 1931)
May 1 – Ludvig Hegner, composer (d. 1923)
May 6 
Aristide Bruant, French singer (d. 1925)
Jean-Alexandre Talazac, operatic tenor (d. 1896)
May 7 – Julius Buths, pianist, conductor and composer (d. 1920)
May 17 – Victor Bendix, pianist, conductor and composer (d. 1926)
June 3 – Theodore Baker, musicologist (died 1934)
June 11 – Oscar Borg, composer (d. 1930)
June 12 – Pol Plançon, operatic bass (d. 1914)
August 8 – Walborg Lagerwall, Swedish violinist (d. 1940)
October 11 – Josif Marinković, composer (d. 1931)
October 16 – Viggo Bielefeldt, composer (d. 1909)
November 5 – Émile Pierre Ratez, composer (d. 1934)
November 16 – Minnie Hauk, operatic soprano (d. 1929)
probable – Marie Heilbron, operatic soprano (d. 1886)

Deaths
January 21 – Albert Lortzing, composer (b. 1801)
January 24 – Gaspare Spontini, composer (b. 1774)
February 20 – Josef Alois Ladurner, Austrian composer and pedagogue (b. 1769)
March 6
Alexander Alyabyev, composer (b. 1787)
Emma Hartmann, composer (b. 1807)
April 8 – John Parry (Bardd Alaw), harpist and composer (b. 1776)
July 4 – Martin-Joseph Mengal, composer (b. 1784)
July 17 – Béni Egressy, composer and librettist (b. 1814)
August 8 – James Shudi Broadwood, piano-maker (b. 1772)
October 8 – George Alexander Lee, singer, songwriter and opera producer (b. 1802)
December 1 – Carl Dahlén, ballet dancer and choreographer (b. 1770)

External links

 
19th century in music
Music by year